Ulysses S. "Lissy" Young (1894 – April 22, 1927) was an American football, basketball, and baseball coach and college athletics administrator. He served as head football coach at Lincoln University in Pennsylvania from 1923 to 1926, compiling a record of 21–5–6. A native of Orange, New Jersey, Young played football, basketball, and baseball at Lincoln, before graduating in 1917. He played all three sports alongside his younger brother, William Pennington Young, who also graduated in 1917.

Young was the athletic supervisor for colored schools in Evansville, Indiana before succeededing James H. Law as athletic director at Lincoln in 1923. He also coached basketball and baseball at Lincoln. Young died on April 22, 1927, following an operation at Johns Hopkins Hospital in Baltimore, Maryland.

Head coaching record

References

1894 deaths
1927 deaths
Lincoln Lions athletic directors
Lincoln Lions baseball coaches
Lincoln Lions baseball players
Lincoln Lions football coaches
Lincoln Lions football players
Lincoln Lions men's basketball coaches
Lincoln Lions men's basketball players
People from Orange, New Jersey
Sportspeople from Essex County, New Jersey
Coaches of American football from New Jersey
Players of American football from New Jersey
Baseball coaches from New Jersey
Baseball players from New Jersey
Basketball coaches from New Jersey
Basketball players from New Jersey
African-American coaches of American football
African-American players of American football
African-American baseball coaches
African-American baseball players
African-American basketball coaches
African-American basketball players
African-American college athletic directors in the United States